The Pembroke Hamilton Club Zebras is a Bermudian football club who participate in the Bermudian Premier Division.

They play their home games on PHC Field at "Stadium Lane", which was reopened in 2015 after 17 years. It was named Warwick Stadium when it hosted its first match in the Bermuda Football Union.

History
PHC Zebras have won the Bermudian Premier Division title 11 times and the Bermuda FA Cup 11 times but only three times since 1980. In the 2016–17 season, PHC went on to win the Bermuda FA Cup for a record 11th time.

Achievements
Bermudian Premier Division: 11

 1970–71, 1976–77, 1984–85, 1985–86, 1988–89, 1989–90, 1991–92, 1999–2000, 2007–08, 2017–18, 2018–19

Bermuda FA Cup: 11
 1956–57, 1959–60, 1960–61, 1961–62, 1966–67, 1970–71, 1974–75, 1979–80, 1991–92, 2007–08, 2016–17

Players

Current squad
 For 2015–2016 season

Notable players

Historical list of coaches

  Edward Durham (1992–1997)
  Kyle Lightbourne (Aug 2006 – Mar 2011)
  Brian "Bulla" Anderson (Aug 2011–2012)
  Mark Wade (2013–2016)
  Scott Morton (Aug 2016–present)

References

External links
 Club page – Bermuda FA

Football clubs in Bermuda
Association football clubs established in 1950
1950 establishments in Bermuda
Pembroke Parish